Ami Bluebell Dolenz (born January 8, 1969) is an American former actress.

Early life
Dolenz was born in Burbank, California, into a show business family. She is the daughter of Micky Dolenz of the 1960s group the Monkees, and British television presenter Samantha Juste. Her paternal grandparents were the film actors George Dolenz and Janelle Johnson.

Career
At age 15, Dolenz won a junior talent contest and decided to become an actress. She dropped out of high school and began appearing in roles on various television series. One of her first acting roles was in the television movie The Children of Times Square, followed by a two-episode stint on Growing Pains. In 1987, she had a small role in the comedy Can't Buy Me Love. Later that year, she landed the role of Melissa McKee in the long-running soap opera General Hospital; the role garnered critical attention for Dolenz and she earned two nominations (in 1988 and 1989, respectively) for a Young Artist Award.

After leaving General Hospital in 1989, Dolenz landed a co-starring role opposite Tony Danza in She's Out of Control. The following year, she portrayed Sloane Peterson in Ferris Bueller, a television sitcom based on Ferris Bueller's Day Off, which lasted only thirteen episodes and was cancelled in 1991. After its demise, Dolenz starred in Children of the Night and then had the lead role in 1992's Miracle Beach.

Throughout the 1990s, Dolenz continued to appear in films and television, including Witchboard 2: The Devil's Doorway; Pumpkinhead II: Blood Wings; Murder, She Wrote; Wake, Rattle and Roll; Saved by the Bell: The College Years; Demolition University; Pacific Blue; and Teen Angel. In 1998, she voiced a character for the children's show The Secret Files of the Spy Dogs. After a four-year hiatus from acting, Dolenz returned in the independent film Mr. Id, in a co-starring role with Steve Parlavecchio. In 2007, she appeared in the film Even If, which she also produced.

Personal 
On August 10, 2002, Dolenz married actor and martial artist Jerry Trimble.

In addition to acting, Dolenz and her husband manage KidPix Productions, a company that stages movie shoots as birthday parties for children. She also performs with the Write Act Repertory Theatre, and owns Bluebell Boutique, an online custom jewelry shop that she previously co-owned and operated with her late mother.

Selected filmography

Award nominations

References

External links 
 
 

1969 births
20th-century American actresses
21st-century American actresses
Actresses from California
American people of Slovenian descent
American people of English descent
American child actresses
American film actresses
American women film producers
Film producers from California
American television actresses
Living people
People from Burbank, California
The Monkees
Dolenz family